Arthur Worth Collins (September 26, 1890 – August 19, 1970) was an American college football player and coach. The son of a pastor, he was born in Siam (presently Thailand) and served as the head football at Baldwin Wallace University in Berea, Ohio from 1924 to 1927, compiling a record of 11–19–2.

Head coaching record

College

References

External links
 

1890 births
1970 deaths
Baldwin Wallace Yellow Jackets athletic directors
Baldwin Wallace Yellow Jackets football coaches
Wooster Fighting Scots football players
High school football coaches in Ohio
Arthur W. Collins